Sisaket Football Club is a former Thai professional football club

History

The early years
The club was founded as Sisaket F.C. in 2009 and won the Thai Provincial League. The team was founded by the Sports Authority of Thailand in collaboration with the Football Association of Thailand.

In 2008 they were promoted from the Regional League Division 2 to take them back to the Thai First Division.

Promotion to the Thai Premier League
Sisaket were promoted to the Premier league in 2010 after finishing third in the 2009 Thai Division 1 League.

Name change and relocation
In 2012 the club relocated to Ubon Ratchathani Province after the local Sisaket government decided to back the newly formed Sisaket United F.C. The club also changed their name to Esan United. Esan United finished the season in 6th, a record for the club.

Return to Sisaket
In 2013 the Football Association of Thailand found Esan United guilty of forging documents, causing the club return to Sisaket. Due to legal conflicts, Sisaket were suspended for the rest of the season but were not relegated.

The club returned to the Thai Premier League in 2014, returning to their old name of Sisaket F.C and used Sri Nakhon Lamduan Stadium as their home ground.

Stadium and locations by season records

Seasons

P = Played
W = Games won
D = Games drawn
L = Games lost
F = Goals for
A = Goals against
Pts = Points
Pos = Final position
N/A = No answer

TPL = Thai Premier League
TL = Thai League 1

QR1 = First Qualifying Round
QR2 = Second Qualifying Round
QR3 = Third Qualifying Round
QR4 = Fourth Qualifying Round
RInt = Intermediate Round
R1 = Round 1
R2 = Round 2
R3 = Round 3

R4 = Round 4
R5 = Round 5
R6 = Round 6
GR = Group stage
QF = Quarter-finals
SF = Semi-finals
RU = Runners-up
S = Shared
W = Winners

Coaches

 Chartkla Subsongpol 
 Somchart Yimsiri 
 Freddy Marinho 
 Kim Kyung-Ju 
 Wisoot Wichaya 
 Dave Booth 
 Reuther Moreira 
 Narong Suwannachot 
 Paniphon Kerdyam 
 Chalermwoot Sa-ngapol 
 Božidar Bandović 
 Masahiro Wada 
 Dusit Chalermsan 
 Velizar Popov 
 Chalermwoot Sa-ngapol 
 Robert Jose da Silva 
 Somchai Chuayboonchum 
 Worachai Surinsirirat 
 Chusak Sriphum 
 Sarayuth Chaikamdee 
 Worrawoot Srimaka 	
 Santi Chaiyaphuak

Honours

Domestic competitions
Provincial League
Winners (1): 1999-00
Thai Division 2 League 
Runners-up (1): 2008
League Cup
Runners-up (1): 2015

References

External links
 Official Website
 Official Facebook

 
Thai League 1 clubs
Football clubs in Thailand
Sport in Sisaket province
Ubon Ratchathani province
Association football clubs established in 2009
2009 establishments in Thailand